The Alcorn State Braves baseball team is the varsity intercollegiate baseball program of Alcorn State University in Lorman, Mississippi, United States. The program's first season was in 1959, and it has been a member of the NCAA Division I Southwestern Athletic Conference since the start of the 1963 season. Its home venue is the Foster Baseball Field at McGowan Stadium, located on Alcorn State's campus. Reggie Williams is the team's head coach starting in the 2022 season. The program has appeared in 1 NCAA Tournaments. It has won one conference tournament championships and 0 regular season conference titles. As of the start of the 2021 Major League Baseball season, 1 former Brave has appeared in Major League Baseball.

History

Early history
The program's first season of play was 1959.

Conference affiliations
 Southwestern Athletic Conference (1963–present)

Foster Baseball Field at McGowan Stadium

The stadium is named for Willie McGowan, head baseball coach from 1972 to 2009.  In 38 years as Alcorn State's coach, McGowan won over 700 games.  The field and stadium were officially dedicated on September 4, 2010.  Plaques commemorating the dedications were added on May 6, 2011.

Head coaches
Alcorn State's longest tenured head coach was Willie E. "Rat" McGowan, who has coached the team from 1972 to 2009.

Notable former players
Below is a list of notable former Braves and the seasons in which they played for Alcorn State.

 Al Jones (1978–1981)
 Corey Wimberly (2002-2004)

See also
 List of NCAA Division I baseball programs

References

External links